Miss Pays de la Loire is a French beauty pageant which selects a representative for the Miss France national competition from the region of Pays de la Loire. Women representing the region under various different titles have competed at Miss France since 1960, although the Miss Pays de la Loire title was not used regularly until 2006. Until 2010, women from the department of Loire-Atlantique were eligible to compete in Miss Brittany rather than Miss Pays de la Loire, due to the department's historical ties to Brittany despite currently being located within the region of Pays de la Loire.

The current Miss Pays de la Loire is Emma Guibert, who was crowned Miss Pays de la Loire 2022 on 24 September 2022. Three women from Pays de la Loire have gone on to win Miss France.
Jacqueline Gayraud, who was crowned Miss France 1964, competing as Miss Vendée, following the dethroning of the original winner
Linda Hardy, who was crowned Miss France 1992
Valérie Claisse, who was crowned Miss France 1994

Results summary
Miss France: Linda Hardy (1991); Valérie Claisse (1993)
1st Runner-Up: Jacqueline Gayraud (1963; Miss Vendée; later Miss France); Marie-Thérèse Vermond (1967; Miss Vendée); Mathilde Couly (2011)
2nd Runner-Up: Sandrine Hamidi (1996; Miss Anjou); Sabrina Champin (2004; Miss Maine); Laura Tanguy (2007); Élodie Martineau (2008)
4th Runner-Up: Séverine Deroualle (1995; Miss Anjou); Mélinda Paré (2012)
5th Runner-Up: Maud Perrochon (1998; Miss Anjou)
6th Runner-Up: Maud Garnier (1999); Yvana Cartaud (2019)
Top 12/Top 15: Sonia Baffour (1991; Miss Anjou); Patricia Blain (1993; Miss Maine); Aude Rautureau (1998); Hélène Leroyer (2000; Miss Anjou); Christine Rambaud (2006); Julie Tagliavacca (2020); Line Carvalho (2021); Emma Guibert (2022)

Titleholders

Miss Anjou
From the 1970s until the 2000s, the department of Maine-et-Loire competed separately under the title Miss Anjou. In 1967, the department competed as Miss Val de Loire.

Miss Brière
In 1977 and 1978, the department of Loire-Atlantique competed separately under the title Miss Brière.

Miss Maine
In the 1990s and 2000s, the departments of Mayenne and Sarthe competed separately under the title Miss Maine.

Miss Mayenne
In the 1970s and 1980s, the department of Mayenne crowned its own representative for Miss France.

Miss La Baule
In 1962, the department of Loire-Atlantique competed separately under the title Miss La Baule.

Miss Sarthe
In the 1970s and 1980s, the department of Sarthe crowned its own representative for Miss France.

Miss Vendée
In 1964 and 1967, the department of Vendée crowned its own representative for Miss France.

Notes

References

External links

Miss France regional pageants
Beauty pageants in France
Women in France